Georges Saint-Paul ( – ) was a French military doctor and researcher. General practitioner and writer.

Saint-Paul was the author of literary and scientific works under the pseudonyms of: G. Espé de Metz and Dr Laupts.

Biography
Georges Saint-Paul was born in Montigny-lès-Metz, France on 17 April 1870. He received his medical degree in France in 1892. 

After joined the French armed forces, Saint-Paul served as a Doctor-major in Algeria, then in Tunisia.  He was then stationed in France at Tours, then Nancy. In 1926, Saint-Paul was appointed director of the Armed Forces Health Service, in Nancy, with the rank of general.

In 1931, he created the Association of Geneva places, to promote areas intended to accommodate civilians in the event of armed conflict, anticipating the principles of the Geneva conventions of 1949.

Saint-Paul died on April 7, 1937, at the Château de Rassay, near Genillé in Indre-et-Loire, France.

Works
Saint-Paul, at the instigation of Alexandre Lacassagne, carried out work on interior language. Defender of a scientific psychology, he intended to democratize the method of introspection by applying it to a large sample of individuals. His program is based on what he calls "cerebrology", or science of the brain, a scientific-medical method allowing to pass from individual psychology to a form of general psychology.

Early in his career, Saint-Paul established an epistolary relationship with the German researcher Paul Näcke.  Saint-Paul published several scientific works, in particular on what is initially called "inversion" then on what he will qualify himself. even "homosexuality", under the pseudonym of Dr. Laupts. In 1908, Saint Paul distanced himself from Näcke about his thesis on the "degeneration of France", through the journal Archives de l'anthropologie criminelle.

Saint-Paul also published more literary, dramatic or poetic works, under the pseudonym of G. Espé de Metz. Under the same alias he contributed to the discussion of colonialism in the press, especially around Algeria. Saint-Paul coined the term "endophasia", which he associated with introspection.

Publications

Under his own name
Essays on inner language, Lyon, Stock, 1892
Inner Language and Paraphasias, Paris, Félix Alcan, 1904
The art of public speaking. Aphasia and mental language, Paris, Octave Doin & fils, 1912
read
The global role of the military doctor, preceded by a study on the role of the group of stretcher bearers (G.B.D.) during the war, 1918
Invert and homosexuals, coll. "Thème psychologique", Paris, Vigot, 1930 - 3rd augmented edition (Laupts, 1896 and 1910)
Under the name Dr. Laupts
Tares and poisons. Perversion and sexual perversity. A medical investigation into the inversion. The novel of an invert-born. The Wilde trial. Healing and prophylaxis of inversion, preface by Émile Zola, Paris, G. Carré, 1896.
Homosexuality and homosexual types, preface by Emile Zola, Paris, Vigot, 1910 - augmented edition of 1896.
Under the name G. Espé de Metz
Souvenirs from Tunisia and Algeria, Tunis, J. Danguin, Libraire-Éditeur, 1909.
Vers l'Empire ..., Paris, Ambert, 1913.
By the settlers: Algeria to the Algerians and by the Algerians, ПParis, Émile Larose Libraire-Éditeur, 1914.
Prosodic themes, Paris, Berger-Levrault, 1929.
I appeal to the civilized world: open letter to the members of the S.d.N.,Paris, R. Brumauld, 1929
Psychological themes. Poetry, Prosodism, Grammar, Paris, Vigot and Debresse, 1934.
Ludibria venti. Amusettes, Paris, Debresse, 1935.

References

Sources 
 Pascal Gontrand, "Georges Saint — Paul - PCPT - Civil protection for all [archive]", Geneva, 2008.
 Carroy, Jacqueline. "Inner language as a mirror of the brain: an investigation, its challenges and its limits", In: Langue française, Vol. 132 no 1, The internal word, 2001 (p. 48-56).
 Souvenance, Jean, Notes sur Espé de Metz (1870–1937) and L. Barbedette (1890–1942), Saint-Brieuc, Author-publisher: Jean Souvenance, 1945.
 Arbinet la Bessède, Paul-Émile, "Le Médecin Général Saint-Paul", in Strasbourg medical, 15, 1937, p. 274-281.

1870 births
1937 deaths